Shynola are a directing team who have worked across live-action and animation for over twenty years. Gideon Baws, Chris Harding, Richard Kenworthy and Jason Groves formed Shynola while at art college and immediately earned recognition for their inventive work. 

Their music video work includes Radiohead, Beck, Blur, Coldplay, ABBA and Queens of the Stone Age, with commercials for Nike, Audi, PlayStation and Maserati. They also created notable title sequences for The IT Crowd, The Hitchhiker’s Guide to the Galaxy, Scott Pilgrim vs. the World, Mandy, and Netflix’s GLOW.

They have received scores of awards including a British Independent Film Award and three times Emmy nominations, with multiple wins at Edinburgh International Film Festival, D&AD awards and UK Music Video Awards.

In 2008, founding member Gideon Baws died, age 33.

Notable works

Music videos

Short films
 "Doug Gives a Talk On Electronics" (1999)
 "The Littlest Robo" (2000)
 "Onwards" with James Jarvis for Nike (2009)
 "Dr. Easy" (2013) Warp Films for Film4
 Nowness and Audi presents "Untaggable - How does #music move us?" (2016) (Music by Mark Pritchard feat. Thom Yorke)

Film
 The Hitchhiker's Guide to the Galaxy, guide animations (2004)
 Scott Pilgrim vs. the World, title sequence (2010)
 SpectreVision animated logo (2014)
 Mandy, title sequence (2018)
 Daniel Isn't Real, title sequence (2019)
 Color Out of Space, title sequence (2019)

TV
 "SF:UK" documentary, opening titles (2001)
 "Nathan Barley", various graphics (2005)
 "The IT Crowd", title sequence (2006)
 MTV "BRODOWN" ident with James Jarvis (2012)
 Adam Buxton's "BUG", title sequence (2012)
 Netflix's "GLOW", title sequence (2017)
 Netflix's "Watership Down", prologue graphics (2018)
 Showtime's "VICE", documentary title sequence (2020)

Miscellaneous
 Laura Marling – A Creature I Don't Know: album cover, sleeve design, booklet
 Radiohead and Epic Games – Kid A Mnesia Exhibition: virtual exhibition

Commercials
 Nike Presto: "Brutal Honey", "Orange Monk", "Rabid Panda", "Shady Milkman", "Trouble At Home", "Unholy Cumulus" (2000)
 PlayStation / Frequency: "Qbert", "Worm" (2001)
 Nike / Foot Locker: "Uptempo Press 2", "School Ya Again" (2002)
 Honda: "Tail Pipe" (2005)
 Hulu: "Evolution" (2012)
 Beats Music: "Vision" (2014)
 Delta: "Center of it All" (2016)
 Maserati: "Alive" (2019)
 Facebook: "Fashion" (2019)

Awards and nominations
 Emmy Awards (2018) Nomination for Outstanding Hosted Nonfiction Series or Special "Vice"
 Emmy Awards (2018) Nomination for Outstanding Main Title and Graphic Design for an Animated Program "Watership Down"
 Emmy Awards (2018) Nomination for Outstanding Main Title Design "GLOW"
 British Independent Film Awards (2013) Nomination for Best Short Film "Dr. Easy"
 D&AD Awards (2012) Illustration for Design – Laura Marling album "A Creature I Don't Know"
 D&AD Awards (2010) Music Video (Animation) – Coldplay "Strawberry Swing"
 UK MVA Awards (2009) Video of the Year – Coldplay "Strawberry Swing"
 UK MVA Awards (2009) Best Rock Video – Coldplay "Strawberry Swing"
 UK MVA Awards (2009) Best Animation in a Music Video – Coldplay "Strawberry Swing"
 Arena (magazine) (2005) - Men of the Year
 Edinburgh International Film Festival McLaren Animation Award (2004) – Blur "Good Song"
 UK MVA Awards (2004) Best Animation in a Music Video
 D&AD Awards (2004) Best Direction
 D&AD Awards (2004) Best Animation
 British Animation Awards (2004) Best Music Video – Blur "Good Song"
 MTV VMA award (2003) Best Special Effects in a Video – Queens of the Stone Age "Go with the Flow"
 UK MVA Awards (2003) Best Director
 UK MVA Awards (2003) Best Rock Video – Athlete "You Got The Style"
 LEAF Award (2002) Best Pop Promo – U.N.K.L.E. "Eye 4 An Eye"
 Edinburgh International Film Festival McLaren Animation Award (2002) – U.N.K.L.E. "Eye 4 An Eye"
 NME Brat Award (2002) Best Music Video – Radiohead "Pyramid Song"
 UK MVA Awards (2002) Best Rock Video – Radiohead "Pyramid Song"
 UK MVA Awards (2001) Best Alternative Video – Morgan "Flying High"
 UK MVA Awards (2001) Best Marketing Campaign – Radiohead Blips Kid A
 LEAF Award (2000) Best Computer Animated Advertisement – Nat West "Fishing Line"
 BBC2 Awards (2000) Best Music Video – Quannum "I Changed My Mind"
 UK MVA Awards (2000) Best Budget Video – Quannum "I Changed My Mind"
 Ottawa International Animation Festival (1999) Best Computer Animation "The Littlest Robo"

References

External links

The Directors Bureau's Shynola Section
Annotated Videography
Biography
The Littlest Robo
Raster Interview
Profile of Gideon Baws, on his death

English music video directors